Belgium was represented by Lisa del Bo with the song "Liefde is een kaartspel" at the 1996 Eurovision Song Contest.

Before Eurovision

De gouden zeemeermin 
De gouden zeemeermin was the national final format developed by BRTN in order to select Belgian entry for the Eurovision Song Contest 1996. 40 songs in total took part in the national final, which consisted of four semi-finals between 3 and 24 February 1996 and a final on 9 March 1996. All five shows took place at the Knokke Casino Studios in Knokke and were hosted by Michel Follet and Alexandra Potvin.

Semi-finals 
Ten songs competed in each semi-final with the top three from each qualifying for the final. The results for the semi-finals were determined exclusively by a seven-member jury, who each awarded 12, 10, 8–1 points to their top ten songs, although they could give each song any mark they wished (i.e. they could award 12 points to more than one song if they chose). The results in the final were determined by the votes of five regional juries in Belgium, a press jury and an expert jury.

Final
The final took place on 9 March 1996 where the twelve entries that advanced from the preceding four semi-finals were performed. The winner was selected by a combination of votes from five regional juries in Belgium (5% each), a press jury (25%) and an expert jury (50%). "Liefde is een kaartspel" performed by Lisa del Bo was selected as the winner, having been ranked first by all but the press jury. The top three songs had all come from the third semi-final.

At Eurovision 
In 1996, for the only time in Eurovision history, an audio-only qualifying round of the 29 songs entered (excluding hosts Norway who were exempt) was held in March in order for the seven lowest-scoring songs to be eliminated before the final. "Liefde is een kartspel" placed 12th, thus qualifying for the final. As of 2022, this is the last time that Belgium had sung its entry in Dutch.

On the night of the final del Bo performed 16th in the running order, following the Netherlands and preceding the eventual winner Ireland. At the close of the voting "Liefde is een kaartspel" placed 16th of the 23 entries, having received 22 points. The result was not good enough to prevent Belgium from being relegated from the 1997 contest on the cumulative countback rule. The Belgian jury awarded its 12 points to the United Kingdom.

"Liefde is een kaartspel" later became embroiled in controversy when it was alleged that it had been plagiarised by Sweden's 2001 Eurovision entry "Listen To Your Heartbeat". This was initially denied by the writers of the Swedish song, but Belgian songwriters' association SABAM threatened legal action, and a cash settlement was agreed to forestall this.

Voting

Qualifying round

Final

Notes

References

External links 
 Belgian Preselection 1996

1996
Countries in the Eurovision Song Contest 1996
Eurovision